Maronea is a genus of lichenized fungi in the family Fuscideaceae.

The genus name of Maronea is in honour of Nicoló Marogna (1573-1643), who was an Italian teacher, Apothecary and botanist from Verona.

The genus was circumscribed by Abramo Bartolommeo Massalongo in Flora vol.39 on page 291 in 1856.

References

Umbilicariales
Lecanoromycetes genera
Lichen genera
Taxa described in 1856
Taxa named by Abramo Bartolommeo Massalongo